Saving Faith, written by David Baldacci, is a thriller novel set with backdrop of the political lobbying, political corruption, and blackmail in the US Government. The book was initially published on November 9, 1999, by Warner Books.

Main characters
Danny Buchanan was a highly successful Washington lobbyist who earned a fortune from his trade, and then after a conscience awakening, used it to fund his personal crusade to help the needy in the Third World countries.  In addition to ensuring the aid reached the actually needy, Buchanan also resorted to bribing legislators to support government bills on foreign aid, using the same methods employed in his professional capacity.

Robert Thornhill was a deputy director in the Central Intelligence Agency who oversaw a cabal so secretive that its existence was unknown outside its group, including the president and top leadership of the government.  The cabal believed it alone was capable of protecting the country from external threats, and adopted to keeping compromising information on government officials to get its way, a technique attributed to J. Edgar Hoover, despite the fact that Thornhill deeply resented the FBI over professional rivalry and turf competition.  Thornhill discovered Buchanan's illegal dealings and forced Buchanan to collect incriminating evidence of US legislators, threatening to harm Buchanan's aide, Faith Lockhart.

Faith Lockhart was an invaluable aide to Buchanan's efforts and admired his altruistic causes.  She was worried when Buchanan started to withdraw and even suggested she resign.  Hoping to cut a deal for immunity for herself and Buchanan, she went to the FBI.  Unfortunately, Thornhill was tipped off by a mole inside the bureau and set about a plan to eliminate her, and her accompanying FBI agent.

Lee Adams, ex-Navy boxer and current private investigator, he was hired by an unknown client to watch over Faith.  He was the sole reason Faith survived the attempt on her life which killed the FBI agent escorting her.  Realising she was his only witness to his innocence in the agent's death, he strived to keep her alive and gain her trust so that she would not flee from him.

Brooke Reynolds, FBI agent assigned to Faith.  It was by chance she was not with Faith during the attempt made on the latter's life.  From investigating the attempt which killed one FBI agent, to trying to track down Faith, she also found herself checking if the dead agent was an informant.  However, she soon found herself suspected of being the informant herself.

Plot

The botched attempt on Faith's life led to an all-out hunt for her by three parties – the FBI, the CIA and her boss, Danny Buchanan.  Fleeing for her life, Faith was not sure who she can trust, including the stranger Lee Adams who saved her life and admitted being hired to watch her.

While Faith was on the run, Buchanan planned on turning tables on Thornhill before it was too late, but found himself outclassed as an amateur against a professional spook.

Meanwhile, the FBI began to look among their staff for a traitor, with suspicions falling to the dead agent, and Brooke Reynolds.

Despite the setbacks, Thornhill began masterminding several separate moves to deal with Buchanan, Faith and the FBI.

References

American thriller novels
1999 American novels
Novels by David Baldacci
Political thriller novels
American political novels